2028 Janequeo, provisional designation , is a stony Florian asteroid from the inner regions of the asteroid belt, approximately 3 kilometers in diameter. It was discovered on July 18th 1968, by Chilean astronomers Carlos Torres and S. Cofre at the Cerro El Roble Station of Chile's National Astronomical Observatory. The asteroid named after the indigenous heroine Janequeo (Yanequén).

Classification and orbit 

Janequeo is a member of the Flora family, one of the largest collisional populations of stony asteroids. It orbits the Sun in the inner main-belt at a distance of 2.0–2.6 AU once every 3 years and 6 months (1,271 days). Its orbit has an eccentricity of 0.11 and an inclination of 8° with respect to the ecliptic. The body's observation arc begins at the discovering observatory one night after its official discovery observation on 19 July 1968.

Physical characteristics

Lightcurves 

In August 2010, a rotational lightcurve of Janequeo was obtained from photometric observations by astronomers at the Palomar Transient Factory in California. Lightcurve analysis gave a short rotation period of 2.480 hours with a brightness amplitude of 0.27 magnitude.

Diameter and albedo 

According to the survey carried out by the NEOWISE mission of NASA's Wide-field Infrared Survey Explorer, Janequeo measures 3.201 kilometers in diameter and its surface has an albedo of 0.273. The Collaborative Asteroid Lightcurve Link assumes an albedo of 0.24 – derived from 8 Flora, the largest member and namesake of the Flora family – and calculates a diameter of 2.45 kilometers based on an absolute magnitude of 15.22.

Naming 

This minor planet was named after Janequeo (Yanequén), a heroine and leader of the native Mapuche people of Chile. After her husband Huepotaén died in battle against the colonial Spaniards during the Arauco War in the 16th century, she became tribal chief and brought together various rebellious tribes. The approved naming citation was published by the Minor Planet Center on 1 June 1980.

See also
 1992 Galvarino

References

External links 
 Asteroid Lightcurve Database (LCDB), query form (info )
 Dictionary of Minor Planet Names, Google books
 Asteroids and comets rotation curves, CdR – Observatoire de Genève, Raoul Behrend
 Discovery Circumstances: Numbered Minor Planets (1)-(5000) – Minor Planet Center
 
 

 

002028
Discoveries by Carlos Torres (astronomer)
Discoveries by S. Cofré
Named minor planets
19680718